Michael Edward Guerra (born September 9, 1981), is a California-based accordionist, music producer, studio musician, and singer/songwriter.

Guerra has performed and recorded with various bands, including The Mavericks, and Raul Malo, and has also led his own band, The Michael Guerra Band.

Since 2012, he has continuously been on tour and performs with the Mavericks.

In the Summer of 2012, Guerra co-founded a production company DB Media Entertainment with songwriting partner D.R. Pedraza and produced his first film score for the short film "To Serve and Protect"

In 2014, Guerra produced his second film score for "The Last Rose"

In August 2015, Guerra produced his third film score for the film "My Tempest" and was nominated for Best Score in the 48 Hour Film Project, San Antonio

In 2016, Guerra released a new single "Such A Girl Like That" under a new band, Michael Guerra & The Nights Calling. The song debuted on KSYM-FM Radio on May 5, 2016

Also in 2016, Guerra produced his fourth film score for the short film "A Chance to Say Goodbye"

In 2017, Guerra was the composer for the television series Slate Me! which ran for three seasons

Under his new bands name, The Nights Calling, Guerra released the first single on the new album "Groove All Night," "Groove All Night" under his own label.

In 2020, Guerra is producing scores for two projects for DB Media Entertainment, one a television series called "The Route 66 Interviews:  Foodies who Rock and for a feature film "Isadora" both filming in 2021

Discography

Los Tex Maniacs 
2006 – A Tex Mex Groove by Los Tex-maniacs (Maniax Records) Guerra plays accordion

Michael Guerra Band 
2012 – The Michael Guerra Band by The Michael Guerra Band (BMI/MGB Music) Released in 2012

Michael Guerra & The Nights Calling 
2016 Such A Girl Like That Single by Michael Guerra & The Nights Calling (BMI/MGB Music)
2019 Groove All Night Single by Michael Guerra & The Nights Calling (BMI/MGB Music)

Recordings by other artists 
2003 - Shawn Sahm by Shawn Sahm Guerra plays accordion
2020 - En Espanol by The Mavericks  Guerra plays Accordion, bajo sexto, various percussion;background vocals
2005 - Heard it on the X by Los Super Seven  Guerra plays background vocals
2006 - My Freeholies Ain't Free Anymore by Augie Meyers Guerra plays accordion, background vocals
2006 – Sacred by Los Lonely Boys (Sony BMG) Guerra plays accordion
2008 – Tex Mex Experience by Tex Mex Experience (Evangeline) Guerra plays bajo sexto
2008 – Prayer of a Common Man by Phil Vassar (Universal South) Guerra plays accordion
2010 - Esta Bueno by Texas Tornados Guerra plays Bajo Sexto, background vocals
2010 - Americano by The Krayolas  Guerra plays Accordion
2010 – Sinners & Saints by Raul Malo (Fantasy Records) Guerra plays accordion
2012 - Around the World by Raul Malo Guerra plays accordion
2013 – In Time by The Mavericks (Valory Music) Guerra plays Accordion, bajo sexto, various percussion
2014 - Real by Michael Hardie  Guerra plays Accordion
2015 – Mono by The Mavericks (Valory Music) Guerra plays Accordion, bajo sexto, various percussion
2015 - 40 Years by The Bellamy Brothers Guerra plays accordion
2017 – Brand New Day by The Mavericks (Mono Mundo Recordings) Guerra plays Accordion, bajo sexto, various percussion;background vocals

2017 - Highways and Heart Attacks by Will Beeley  Guerra plays Accordion
2017 - South Texas Suite by Whitney Rose Guerra plays accordion
2018 - Hey! Merry Christmas! by The Mavericks  Guerra plays Accordion, bajo sexto, various percussion, background vocals
2019 - Play The Hits by The Mavericks  Guerra is a featured artist and plays percussion and Cajun Accordion
2019 - Groove All Night by Michael Guerra  Guerra plays Accordion, bajo sexto, various percussion; vocals
2020 - En Espanol by The Mavericks  Guerra plays Accordion, bajo sexto, various percussion, background vocals
2020 - Technicolor by The Sweet Lizzy Project  Guerra plays Accordion,

Filmography 
2012 - "To Serve and Protect" produced by DB Media Entertainment Composer
2014 - "The Last Rose" produced by DB Media Entertainment Composer and Music Editor
2015 - "My Tempest" produced by DB Media Entertainment Writer, Editor and Composer
2016 - "A Chance to Say Goodbye" produced by DB Media Entertainment Composer
2017 - "Slate Me!" produced by DB Media Entertainment co-producer and Composer
2020 - "Isadora" produced by DB Media Entertainment to be filmed in 2021, Film Score
2020 - "The Route 66 Interviews: Foodies who Rock" produced by DB Media Entertainment to be filmed in 2021, Score and Composer

References 

1981 births
Living people
Musicians from Los Angeles
Country musicians from California
The Mavericks members
American accordionists